The integrated gate-commutated thyristor (IGCT) is a power semiconductor electronic device, used for switching electric current in industrial equipment. It is related to the gate turn-off (GTO) thyristor.

It was jointly developed by Mitsubishi and ABB. Like the GTO thyristor, the IGCT is a fully controllable power switch, meaning that it can be turned both on and off by its control terminal (the gate). Gate drive electronics are integrated with the thyristor device.

Device description

An IGCT is a special type of thyristor. It is made of the integration of the gate unit with the Gate Commutated Thyristor (GCT) wafer device. The close integration of the gate unit with the wafer device ensures fast commutation of the conduction current from the cathode to the gate. The wafer device is similar to a gate turn-off thyristor (GTO). They can be turned on and off by a gate signal, and withstand higher rates of voltage rise (dv/dt), such that no snubber is required for most applications.

The structure of an IGCT is very similar to a GTO thyristor. In an IGCT, the gate turn-off current is greater than the anode current. This results in a complete elimination of minority carrier injection from the lower PN junction and faster turn-off times. The main differences are a reduction in cell size, and a much more substantial gate connection with much lower inductance in the gate drive circuit and drive circuit connection. The very high gate currents and fast dI/dt rise of the gate current mean that regular wires can not be used to connect the gate drive to the IGCT. The drive circuit PCB is integrated into the package of the device.  The drive circuit surrounds the device and a large circular conductor attaching to the edge of the IGCT is used. The large contact area and short distance reduce both the inductance and resistance of the connection.

The IGCT's much faster turn-off times compared to the GTO's allows it to operate at higher frequencies—up to several kHz for very short periods of time. However, because of high , typical operating frequency is up to 500 Hz.

Neutron-Transmutation-Doped Silicon used as the IGCT base substrate.

IGCTs, in high power applications, are sensitive to cosmic rays. To decrease cosmic ray induced malfunctions, more thickness in the n− base is required.

Reverse bias

IGCT are available with or without reverse blocking capability.  Reverse blocking capability adds to the forward voltage drop because of the need to have a long, low-doped P1 region.

IGCTs capable of blocking reverse voltage are known as symmetrical IGCT, abbreviated S-IGCT. Usually, the reverse blocking voltage rating and forward blocking voltage rating are the same.  The typical application for symmetrical IGCTs is in current source inverters.

IGCTs incapable of blocking reverse voltage are known as asymmetrical IGCT, abbreviated A-IGCT. They typically have a reverse breakdown rating in the tens of volts. A-IGCTs are used where either a reverse conducting diode is applied in parallel (for example, in voltage source inverters) or where reverse voltage would never occur (for example, in switching power supplies or DC traction choppers).

Asymmetrical IGCTs can be fabricated with a reverse conducting diode in the same package.  These are known as RC-IGCT, for reverse conducting IGCT.

Applications

The main applications are in variable-frequency inverters, drives, traction and fast AC disconnect switches.
Multiple IGCTs can be connected in series or in parallel for higher power applications.

See also
 Thyristor
 Gate turn-off thyristor
 Insulated-gate bipolar transistor

References

External links
 'IGCT Technology-A Quantum Leap', pdf

Solid state switches